Aunt Petunia can refer to:
 The Thing's aunt Petunia Grimm
 Harry Potter's aunt, Petunia Dursley
 The puppet in Meet the Robinsons